is the eighth single by Japanese girl group Melon Kinenbi. It was released on January 29, 2003, and its highest position on the Oricon weekly chart was #10. This made it Melon Kinenbi's first single to rank within the top 10. It was also used as an audition song for the sixth generation of Morning Musume, the main "super-group" in Hello! Project.

Track listing

External links
Akai Freesia at the Up-Front Works release list (Japanese)

2003 singles
Zetima Records singles
Song recordings produced by Tsunku
2003 songs
Song articles with missing songwriters
Songs written by Tsunku